Brigette Lundy-Paine (born August 10, 1994) is an American actor. They first came to prominence for portraying Casey Gardner on all four seasons of the Netflix comedy-drama Atypical (2017–2021). In 2020, Lundy-Paine achieved further recognition for playing Billie Logan, the daughter of Ted Logan, in the science fiction comedy film Bill & Ted Face the Music.

Personal life
Born August 10, 1994, in Dallas, Texas, Brigette Lundy-Paine is the child of Laura Lundy and Robert Paine, who are both actors and directors, and has a younger brother. When Lundy-Paine was two years old, their family moved to Alameda, California. In 2012, they graduated from Encinal High School, where they were a cheerleader. They graduated from New York University in 2015.

On November 8, 2019, Lundy-Paine came out as non-binary, going by they/them pronouns. They have also been involved as an activist, including participating in the Black Lives Matter movement.

Career 
Lundy-Paine is known for their portrayal of Casey Gardner on the television series Atypical.  Lundy-Paine also co-founded the "vocal band" Subtle Pride, as well as Waif Magazine, an art publication.

Filmography

References

External links
 

1994 births
21st-century American actors
American film actors
Living people
American non-binary actors
Non-binary musicians
American television actors
21st-century LGBT people
New York University alumni